Jacobo Mansilla (born June 15, 1987 in Castelli) is an Argentine footballer, who plays as a midfielder for Brown de Adrogué

Mansilla made his league debut as a substitute against Gimnasia y Esgrima de Jujuy on June 16, 2007 where he came on as a stoppage time substitute in a meaningless last game of the season fixture.

References

External links
 Argentine Primera statistics  
 

1987 births
Living people
Sportspeople from Buenos Aires Province
Argentine footballers
Argentine expatriate footballers
Association football midfielders
Quilmes Atlético Club footballers
Club Atlético Independiente footballers
Club Atlético Colón footballers
Defensores de Belgrano footballers
Club Atlético Brown footballers
Newell's Old Boys footballers
Club Olimpo footballers
Club Atlético Tigre footballers
San Luis de Quillota footballers
Club Atlético Patronato footballers
Gimnasia y Esgrima de Mendoza
Argentine Primera División players
Primera Nacional players
Primera B Metropolitana players
Chilean Primera División players
Expatriate footballers in Chile
Argentine expatriate sportspeople in Chile